The 2017 American Athletic Conference football season is the 26th NCAA Division I FBS Football season of the American Athletic Conference (The American). The season is the fifth since the former Big East Conference dissolved and became the American Athletic Conference, and the fourth season with the College Football Playoff in place. The American is considered a member of the "Group of Five" (G5), meaning that the conference shares with the other G5 conferences one automatic spot in the New Year's Six bowl games.  The conference game schedule for the 2017 season was released on February 9, 2017.

American Athletic Conference Media Day
The American Athletic Conference Media Day took place July 18– in Newport, Rhode Island.

Preseason poll

East Division
1. USF (30), 180 pts
2. UCF, 126 pts
3. Temple, 119 pts
4. Cincinnati, 100 pts
5. East Carolina, 63 pts
6. UConn, 42 pts

	
West Division
1. Memphis (22), 169 pts
2. Houston (6), 137 pts
3. Navy (1), 128 pts
4. Tulsa (1), 102 pts
5. SMU, 64 pts
6. Tulane, 30 pts

 Predicted American Championship Game Winner 
1. USF (26) 
2. Houston (2)
3. Memphis (1)
4. Navy (1)

Head coaches
Note: All stats current through the completion of the 2016 season* Randy Edsall coached UConn from 1999–2010, and is returning in 2017. UConn was a member of the Big East from 2004–2012.† Major Applewhite was hired to replace Tom Herman in December 2016 at Houston and coached the Cougars in their 2016 bowl game.''

Source:

Recruiting classes

Rankings

Schedule
The conference's schedule was released on February 9, 2017. The regular season began on August 27, 2017, when South Florida visits San Jose State. The first conference games played on September 9. The conference season ended with the AAC Championship game on December 2, 2017.

Week 1

The game between Houston and UTSA was cancelled due to the aftermath of Hurricane Harvey. It was originally scheduled for September 2 at the Alamodome in San Antonio.

Week 2

The game between UCF and Memphis was cancelled due to Hurricane Irma. It was originally scheduled for September 9 at 8:00 p.m. before it was moved to September 8 at 6:30 p.m. The game has been rescheduled for September 30.
The game between UConn and USF was cancelled due to Hurricane Irma. It was originally scheduled for September 9 at 12:00 p.m. before it was moved to 10:30 a.m. The game has been rescheduled for November 4.

Week 3

The game between UCF and Georgia Tech was cancelled due to the aftermath of Hurricane Irma. It was originally scheduled for September 16 at 7:30 p.m.

Week 4

Week 5

Week 6

Week 7

Week 8

Week 9

Week 10

Week 11

Week 12

Week 13

Week 14 – AAC Championship game

Week 15

Records against other conferences
2017 records against other college football conferences.

FBS conferences

FCS conferences

Postseason

Postseason

Bowl games
American Athletic Conference bowl games for the 2017 season are:

Rankings are from CFP Poll. All times Eastern Time Zone.

Selection of teams
Bowl eligible:  UCF, South Florida, Memphis, Houston, Navy, SMU, Temple
Bowl-ineligible: Cincinnati, Connecticut, East Carolina, Tulsa, Tulane

Awards and honors

Players of the week

NFL Draft

The following list includes all AAC players who were drafted in the 2018 NFL draft.

Notes

References